"Ebony and Ivory" is a single by Paul McCartney and Stevie Wonder.

Ebony and Ivory may also refer to:
 Ebony and Ivory (piano duo)
 Ebony and Ivory (Devil May Cry), fictional weapons
 "Ebony and Ivory", an episode of Roc
 "Ebony and Ivory", an episode of The Jeffersons
 The keys of a piano

See also 
 Ebony (disambiguation)
 Ivory (disambiguation)